Dries is a Dutch masculine given name, the short version of Andries (see Andre, Andrew) and may refer to:

 Dries van Agt (born 1931), Dutch politician
 Dries Boussatta (born 1972), Dutch footballer 
 Dries Buytaert (born 1978), Belgian computer programmer
 Dries Devenyns (born 1983), Belgian cyclist
 Dries Holten (born 1936), Dutch singer, songwriter
 Dries van der Lof (1919-1990), Dutch racecar driver
 Dries Mertens (born 1987), Belgian football striker
 Dries van Noten (born 1958), Belgian fashion designer
 Dries Roelvink (born 1959), Dutch singer
 Dries De Bondt (born 1991), Belgian cyclist
 Dries Van Langenhove (born 1993), Flemish nationalist

See also 
 Dan Dries, American ice hockey player
 Sheldon Dries, American ice hockey player

Dutch masculine given names